Asociación Deportiva Aserrí Fútbol Club is a Costa Rican football club from the canton of Aserrí, San José Province. It was founded in 1940 and currently play in the Segunda División de Costa Rica.

History

Aserrí F.C. is a soccer team based in the canton of Aserrí, Costa Rica. The club was founded in 1945 by a group of enthusiastic individuals who were determined to create a team that would represent their canton in local and national tournaments.

The origins of Aserrí F.C. can be traced back to the year 1940 when a well-known national politician named Ernesto Maten Carranza formed a soccer team with the same name. The team sported the initials "E.M.C" on their shirts and participated in local and neighborhood tournaments, including one that took place in front of the church in what is now the Desamparados park.

The team included several notable players such as Elías Jiménez, Jorge Gómez, Miguel Ramos, Francisco Chinchilla, Luis Fallas, Efraín Rojas, who was the general captain, Guillermo Abarca, Juan Rafael Solano (known as Yico), Chico Calvo, and Olman Vargas, among others. Yico, in particular, was renowned for his exquisite technique and played barefoot, according to popular accounts.

In 1943, Ernesto Maten Carranza lost interest in the team and decided to stop financing it, which led to its eventual disappearance. However, a few months later, soccer leaders at the national level invited the canton of Aserrí to participate in the first cantonal championship, which was to take place at the National Stadium. In response to this invitation, a group of enthusiastic people in the municipality of Aserrí formed a directive and created a new team to represent their canton. They named the team "Club Atlético Central Aserriceño" (C.A.C.A.) and gave it a green and white uniform with striped shirts. The base of this new team was the recently-disappeared EMC.

C.A.C.A. participated in the cantonal championship and received dividends totaling ¢150 colones as a reward. However, the directors were reportedly not satisfied and decided to discontinue the team, causing it to disappear. The players were not content with this outcome and began discussing possible solutions in the pulperías (local meeting centers). Efraín Rojas took the lead and suggested that they meet at the priest's house to discuss the matter further.

The meeting took place in 1945 and was attended by Elías Jiménez, Juan Rafael Solano (Yico), Francisco Chico Calvo, Marcelino Cascante (Mamino), Carlos Castro, and Rafael Porras Chinchilla. From that day forward, Aserrí F.C. was officially established. The first board of directors was composed of Captain General Efraín Rojas, Secretary Rafael Porras Chinchilla, and Treasurer Carlos Castro.

However, the team faced several challenges in its early days. There was no uniform, and they had no balls or money. But then they remembered the ¢150 colones that they had earned as a profit from the cantonal championship. They obtained the money from the directors of C.A.C.A. and used it to purchase a uniform from Paco Navarrete tailor shop. The uniform had red shirts with a diagonal white stripe. In total, they bought 12 field shirts and 1 goalkeeper shirt for a total cost of ¢120 colones. The remaining ¢30 colones were used to buy two soccer balls, each worth ¢15 colones, from the Sport Center, a well-known sports store.

Aserrí F.C. played its first game against the Manuel Hidalgo Mora School and won with a score of 4 to 2. Over

Stadium

This property was previously an open field for amateur soccer.  In 2007, and thanks to the investment of Mr. Minor Vargas (Costa Rican businessman) and his Icon Group, an agreement was reached with the Municipality of the canton to turn it into a quality stadium, despite its small size.

The ST Center has a synthetic grass, bleachers for 2,500 people (although it can be increased depending on the event) and also has artificial lighting.

It has been the headquarters of Costa Rican First and Second Division clubs, such as Brujas Fútbol Club (team now defunct), Asociación Deportiva Barrio México and Aserrí Fútbol Club.

Currently, the stadium is managed by the sons of Minor Vargas, thanks to the contracts still in force with the Santa Teresita de Aserrí Development Association.

Current squad
As of February 22, 2023

Top scorers
Jorge Jimenez 27
Jason Montero 22
Marvin Vargas 17
Aczel Salguero 17
Juan Luis Jawnyj 14
Juan Jose Cruz 12
Reiby Smith 12
Frank Zamora 12
Erick Araya 11
Keisha Davis 11

References 

Association football clubs established in 1940
Football clubs in Costa Rica